Nanocladius is a genus of non-biting midges of the bloodworm family Chironomidae. Larvae either live commensally on or as parasites of aquatic insects in nymphal stages; hosts include mayflies, stoneflies, dobsonflies, or damselflies. The larvae attach to their hosts by forming silken tubes which they later pupate in. They feed on the hemolymph of their host.

References

Chironomidae
Chironomoidea genera
Nematoceran flies of Europe
Taxa named by Jean-Jacques Kieffer